Omar Kâ (born June 5, 1988) is a former Senegalese tennis player.

Kâ won bronze medal with Yannick Languina at the 2015 African Games men's doubles tennis event.  Kâ has a career high ITF juniors ranking of 1,562 achieved on 17 January 2005.

Kâ has represented Senegal at Davis Cup, where he has a win-loss record of 0–2.

Davis Cup

Participations: (0–2)

   indicates the outcome of the Davis Cup match followed by the score, date, place of event, the zonal classification and its phase, and the court surface.

References

External links

1988 births
Living people
Senegalese male tennis players
Competitors at the 2015 African Games
African Games bronze medalists for Senegal
African Games medalists in tennis